Eileen Kowall (born January 5, 1952) is an American politician, dental hygiene practitioner, and business woman from Michigan. Kowall is a former member of Michigan House of Representatives. Kowall is the current county commissioner of Oakland County, Michigan.

Education 
Kowall attended Wayne State University. In 1974, Kowall earned an Associate of Arts degree in Dental Hygiene from University of Detroit. Kowall completed the Michigan Excellence in Public Service series.

Career 
In 1974, Kowall became a dental hygiene practitioner, until 1989.

In 1989, Kowall became a business woman as a co-owner, Sales representative and designer of Accurate Woodworking, Incorporate in Waterford, Michigan, until 2004.

On November 4, 2008, Kowall won the election and became a Republican member of Michigan House of Representatives for District 44. Kowall defeated Mark Venie with 66.60% of the votes. On November 2, 2010, as an incumbent, Kowall won the election and continued serving District 44. On November 6, 2012, as an incumbent, Kowall won the election and continued serving District 44. Kowall defeated Tom Crawford and Scott Poquette with 62.79% of the votes.

Kowall's husband, Mike, serves in the Michigan Senate, making them the first married couple to serve in the Legislature at the same time in 25 years (John Engler and Colleen House were the last). Eileen was know to be more conservative than her husband Mike.

In November 2014, Kowall won the election and became a county commissioner of Oakland County, Michigan for District 6. In November 2018, as an incumbent. Kowall won the election and continued serving as a county commissioner of Oakland County, Michigan for District 6. Kowall's term will expire in December 2020.

Personal life 
Kowall's husband is Mike Kowall. They have two children. Kowall and her family live in Waterford Township, Michigan.

See also 
 2008 Michigan House of Representatives election
 2010 Michigan House of Representatives election

References

External links 
 Eileen Kowall at ballotpedia.org
 Eileen Kowall at detroitchamber.com

1952 births
Living people
Republican Party members of the Michigan House of Representatives
Women state legislators in Michigan
Politicians from Detroit
People from White Lake, Michigan
University of Detroit Mercy alumni
County commissioners in Michigan
21st-century American politicians
21st-century American women politicians